Oana Botez is a Romanian-American theatre designer. Botez lives in New York City and Bucharest.

Early life 
Botez was born in Craiova, Romania to mother Rodica (Gardareanu) Botez, and father, Demostene Botez and raised in Bucharest. Her younger sister, Raluca, is an actress in Bucharest. Since 1995 she has been designing for stage and film, and has been creating guerrilla performances that draw attention to the political/social issues in a post-revolutionary Romania.

Starting in the 5th grade, Botez attended Liceul de Arte Plastice N.Tonitza, a fine arts conservatory in Bucharest. She received her BFA in Fashion Design from Bucharest Art Academy and an MFA in Design for Theater and Film from the Tisch School of the Arts, NYU.

Career 
Botez is a Princess Grace Recipient and NEA/TCG Career Development Program Recipient. Nominated for The Lucille Lortel Awards, The Henry Hewes Design Awards, The Barrymore, The Theater Bay Area Awards and Drammy Award. She walked away recipient of both The Barrymore Awards for Excellence in Theater and Drammy Award. She taught costume design at Colgate University, Brooklyn College, and MIT.

Ms. Botez is currently an Associate Professor Adjunct in the Design Department at David Geffen School of Drama at Yale

References

External links
 
 
 Oana Botez-Ban at Broadway World
 Oana Botez at Broadway World

Living people
Year of birth missing (living people)
Brooklyn College faculty